Gladys Skelton (6 September 1885 – 29 September 1975) was an Australian and United Kingdom poet, novelist and playwright who wrote using the pseudonym John Presland.

Early life 
Gladys Skelton was born Gladys Williams in Melbourne in 1885.

Career 
Skelton gained history honours at Girton College, Cambridge University and was a university lecturer in English literature and lecturer in history and economics. She was one of a group of women writers who used a male pseudonym. In 1928, after a charge by Lord Birkenhead that women writers were inferior, she wrote in their defence and of her use of a pseudonym.

Personal life 
In 1920 Skelton obtained a divorce from her husband John Herbert Skelton on the grounds of desertion and adultery but the decree nisi was rescinded in 1921. Skelton married Francis Edmund Bendit in Hampstead in March 1943.

She died in England in 1975.

Selected works

Novels 

 Frustration  (1925)
 Dominion (1925) - based on the life of Cecil Rhodes
 Barricade (1926)
 Escape me - Never! (1929)
 Mosaic (1929)
 The Charioteer (1930)
 Albatross (1931)

Poetry 

 The Deluge and Other Poems (1911)
 Songs of Changing Skies (1913)
 Poems of London and Other Verses (1918)
 The Shaken Reed (1943)
 Selected Poems (1961)

Plays 

 The Marionettes (1907) - a puppet show
 Joan of Arc (1909) - historical drama
 Mary Queen of Scots (1910) - historical drama
 Manin and the Defence of Venice (1911)
 Marcus Aurelius (1912)
 Belisarius, General of the East (1913)
 King Monmouth (1916)
 Satni (1929)

Non-fiction 

 Vae Victis: the life of Ludwig von Benedek, 1804-1881. (1934)
 Women in the civilized state (1934)

References 

1885 births
1975 deaths
20th-century Australian novelists
20th-century Australian dramatists and playwrights
20th-century Australian women writers
20th-century Australian poets
Australian women novelists
Australian women dramatists and playwrights
British women dramatists and playwrights
Australian emigrants to the United Kingdom